Mandoul Oriental is one of three departments in Mandoul, a region of Chad. Its capital is Koumra.

Departments of Chad
Mandoul Region